UpStage is an open source server-side application that has been purpose built for Cyberformance: multiple artists collaborate in real time via the UpStage platform to create and present live theatrical performances, for audiences who can be online (from anywhere in the world) or in a shared space, and who can interact with the performance via a text chat tool. It can also be understood as a form of digital puppetry. It is the first open source platform designed specifically for avatar performances.

History and context
The first version of the software was created with a grant from the Smash Palace Collaboration Fund, a joint initiative of Creative New Zealand and the NZ Ministry for Research, Science and Technology; it was launched on 9 January 2004 and began to be used by artists and students around the world, as well as by the originators, Avatar Body Collision.

In 2006, the School of Computing and Mathematical Sciences at the Auckland University of Technology began a relationship with the UpStage project, which has seen teams of final year software development students work on UpStage as a real-world software development project. This has provided invaluable ongoing maintenance and development for the software.

Also in 2006, UpStage received a second grant, this time from the Community Partnership Fund of the New Zealand government's Digital Strategy, which enabled the development of UpStage V2. Douglas Bagnall was once again the lead developer, working this time in conjunction with the AUT students. UpStage V2 was launched in June 2007, with a two-week exhibition at the New Zealand Film Archive and the first UpStage festival, 070707. The festival featured 13 performances by artists from around the world and took place over a 12-hour period on 7 July 2007. 

A second festival was held on 080808 (8–9 August 2008), this time covering an 18-hour period and involving artists from at least 14 time zones. It was reviewed in the Australian Stage Online. Following this, festivals were held annually on the successive monthly dates until 121212 (12 December 2012) when the festival extended over a period of one week and included cyberformance in UpStage and other online platforms. A number of works from previous festivals were restaged as a retrospective programme within the festival.

Although "131313" was not possible, the tenth birthday of UpStage was celebrated 13 months after 121212, with a mini-festival of three performances and a meeting to discuss the future of UpStage. At this point, UpStage was unfunded and sustained by volunteers and the (also voluntary) work of the AUT student team. The meeting took place physically in Wellington, New Zealand, and online participants joined via UpStage. Everyone agreed that the project should continue – somehow – and also agreed that the software itself needs to be completely redeveloped, in order to take advantage of newer technologies and be more easily developed and maintained by globally dispersed open source developers. In 2020 with funding from Creative Europe for the project Mobilise/Demobilise, work on a complete rebuild of the platform was finally able to begin.

Features of UpStage
As a web-based server-side application, UpStage can be accessed by both performers and audiences from almost any internet connected computer, using any operating system and browser; computers behind firewalls may require specific ports to be open. Previously, UpStage used Flash to serve content to the browser, however this dependency is being removed in the current rebuild.

"Players" (performers) log into UpStage and have access to a "workshop" or backstage area where they can upload media (graphics and audio), create "stages", and assign media to stages. Once on the stage, a logged-in player has access to numerous tools which allow them to manipulate the media – place, move and speak aloud with graphical avatars (using text2speech), change backdrops, play audio files, draw directly on the stage in real time, add live web cam feeds, use text chat and perform other tasks in order to create and present a performance.

Audience members (also known as "chatters") do not log in – they simply follow a link from an email or another web page, and arrive at the stage which loads as a web page in their browser. They do not see any of the player tools, but they see and hear everything that the players are creating on the stage, and they can chat in the text chat along with the players. Audience chat appears grey and silent, while player chat is black and spoken aloud.

Newcomers (both players and audience) to UpStage can learn the basics very quickly, and the fact that no additional software download is required (unless the Flash player plug-in is not already installed) makes it very accessible. The chat interface encourages playful banter and audience members contribute to and embellish the performance via the chat.

The media used in UpStage performances is created outside of UpStage, using graphic or audio software. Once optimised for Upstage, it is then uploaded via the web interface known as the Workshop and becomes available to everyone who has a log in for that particular UpStage server.

UpStage is an open source project; it can be downloaded from the GitHub site and installed on a web server, giving control over who has log-in access. The interface can also be customised.

Artists using UpStage

Current:
 Christina Papagiannouli and Etheatre
 Clara Gomes
 Gabriella Sacco, Floris Sirag and Petyr Veenstra
 Helen Varley Jamieson
 Katarina Djordjevic Urosevic & colleagues
 Miljana Peric
 KiG! Kultur in Graz
 Teater InterAkt
 Eva Ursprung
 Vicki Smith

Past (a complete lists of artists who have worked with UpStage is available on the UpStage website):
 Avatar Body Collision
 ActiveLayers
 Anaesthesia Associates
 [Plaintext_Players] (Antoinette LaFarge & company)
 Ben Unterman and colleagues
 Marlena Corcoran
 Pauline Bastard
 Kristin Carlson & Sheila Page
 Rebekah Wild
 Helena Martin Franco

Further reading

 Francesco Buonaiuto, Helen Varley Jamieson and Vicki Smith, The Net and the Butterfly, published in International Journal of Performance Arts and Digital Media Volume 10 Issue 1, 2014 - special issue on “Interdisciplinary Approaches to Documenting Performance”
  Eliza Bent, Preview of the 121212 UpStage Festival of Cyberformance, American Theatre Magazine, 12 December 2012
 Christina Papagiannouli, Cyberformance and the Cyberstage, published in the International Journal of the Arts in Society, vol 6 issue 4, 2011
 Helen Varley Jamieson and Vicki Smith, UpStage: An Online Tool for Real-Time Storytelling, published in Creative Technologies Journal, Issue 2, November 2011
 Su Ballard & Stella Brennan (eds), The Aotearoa Digital Arts Reader, published by Aotearoa Digital Arts and Clouds, August 2008. 
 Bree Hadley, 080808 UpStage Festival|080808 UpStage Festival, The Australian Stage Online, 9 August 2008
 Helen Varley Jamieson, "UpStage: A Platform for Creating and Performing Online," IEEE MultiMedia, vol. 14, no. 3, pp. 8–10, Jul-Sept, 2007
 Patricia Jung and Helen Varley Jamieson, "Online performances mit UpStage" - chapter in Video: Wiedergabe, Bearbeitung und Streaming unter Linux, ed. Nils Magnus and Torsten Spindler, published by Open Source Press, 2005. 
 Patricia Jung, "Performers Go Web",  Linux Journal, April 2005;

References

External links
 UpStage web site
 UpStage on GitHub - complete rebuild of UpStage (2020-21)
 We have a situation!

Theatre
Internet art
Digital art
Computer art